Malice Aforethought is a crime novel by Francis Iles.

Malice Aforethought can also refer to:

Malice Aforethought (TV series), BBC adaptation of the novel
Malice Aforethought (film), Granada adaptation of the novel

See also
Malice aforethought, a legal concept